Sciocochlea is a genus of gastropods belonging to the family Clausiliidae.

The species of this genus are found in Greece.

Species:

Sciocochlea collasi 
Sciocochlea cryptica 
Sciocochlea llogaraensis 
Sciocochlea nordsiecki

References

Clausiliidae